Opeyemi is a given name and surname of Yoruba origin. It may refer to:

People
Given name
Opeyemi Oke (born 1954), Nigerian jurist and current chief judge of Lagos State
Opeyemi Fagbohungbe, Ghanaian actor with a role in Beasts of No Nation''
Opeyemi Sowore, the Nigerian American wife of Omoyele Sowore

Middle name
Michael Opeyemi Bamidele (born 1963) popularly known as MOB, Nigerian Lawyer, human right activist, politician and member of the 7th, 8th and night National - 22:56, 28 June 2020

Surname
Tijani Luqman Opeyemi (born 1990), Nigerian football player

Yoruba given names
Yoruba-language surnames